Tadashi Kodaira (August 1, 1915 – December 3, 2000) was a Japanese politician from Iwamizawa, Hokkaido. He was the father of Tadamasa Kodaira. He was a member of the House of Representatives of Japan from the Hokkaido 4th district. He is a graduate of Nihon University.

Politicians from Hokkaido
Nihon University alumni
1915 births
2000 deaths
People from Iwamizawa, Hokkaido